Sołtyk - is a Polish coat of arms. It was used by several szlachta families in the times of the Polish–Lithuanian Commonwealth.

History

Blazon

Notable bearers

Notable bearers of this coat of arms include:
 Tomasz Sołtyk
 Kajetan Sołtyk
 Stanisław Sołtyk
 Roman Sołtyk

See also

 Polish heraldry
 Heraldry
 List of Polish nobility coats of arms

Sources 
 Dynastic Genealogy 
 Ornatowski.com 

 
Polish coats of arms